Vega de San Mateo is a town and a municipality in the mountainous central part of the island of Gran Canaria in the Province of Las Palmas in the Canary Islands. Its population is 7,774 (2013), and the area is 37.89 km². Vega de San Mateo is located 17 km southwest of Las Palmas.

Historical population

See also
List of municipalities in Las Palmas

References

External links

(town)
(county)
(public transport)
(walking)

Municipalities in Gran Canaria